Schizolaena manomboensis is a tree in the family Sarcolaenaceae. It is endemic to Madagascar. The specific epithet refers to Manombo Reserve where the species is found.

Description
Its coriaceous leaves are elliptic to ovate in shape and are coloured brown above and orangish brown below. The inflorescences have numerous flowers, each with three sepals and five petals.

Distribution and habitat
Schizolaena manomboensis is known only from the eastern coastal regions of Atsinanana and Atsimo-Atsinanana. Its habitat is humid forest from sea-level to  altitude. In Atsimo-Atsinanana, the species occurs in Manombo Reserve where forest is in a less degraded state than nearby areas.

References

manomboensis
Endemic flora of Madagascar
Trees of Madagascar
Plants described in 1999